(Pentamethylcyclopentadienyl)titanium trichloride is an organotitanium compound with the formula Cp*TiCl3 (Cp* = C5(CH3)5).  It is an orange solid.  The compound adopts a piano stool geometry.  An early synthesis involve the combination of lithium pentamethylcyclopentadienide and titanium tetrachloride.  

The compound is an intermediate in the synthesis of decamethyltitanocene dichloride.  In the presence of organoaluminium compounds and other additives, it catalyzes the polymerization of alkenes.

See also
 (Cyclopentadienyl)titanium trichloride

References

Chloro complexes
Titanium compounds
Half sandwich compounds